Secret Combination: The Album is the fourth studio album by Greek American singer Kalomira which was released at the end of May 2008 by Heaven Music. The album has 12 tracks written by Konstantinos Pantzis, Tasos Vougiatzis and Sunny X.

Producers and collaborators 
Kalomira cooperated with very popular and prestigious producers. The writers and composers who participate in the production of the album are: Κonstantinos Pantzis, Sunny X, Tasos Vougiatzis, Poseidonas Giannopoulos, Eftihia Sideri, Marc Eastmont, Nektarios Tirakis and Master Tempo who remixed the song "Secret Combination".

Promotion 
Kalomira released her fourth studio album after conquering third place in the Eurovision Song Contest 2008. She planned on starting full promotion of the album, but on June 2, 2008, when Kalomira was supposed to be the guest on a popular morning show in Greece, she postponed her appearance because she had to fly to New York City immediately due to her sister's pregnancy. On June 4, 2008, Rythmos FM was supposed throw a summer party where Kalomira would perform all her new songs but this was also postponed since she was out of the country.

Dedication 
The album, just like all of Kalomira's other album releases, has a Thank-You's page. She doesn't forget to thank anyone, but she does state that she dedicates this album to her uncle, who died recently.

Track listing 
 "Secret Combination" - 3:03
 "Sto Diko Mou Rythmo" (To My Rhythm) - 3:29
 "All That I Need" - 3:47
 "Fall to You" - 4:41
 "S'Agapo" (I Love You) - 3:14
 "Kathe Fora" (Every time) - 3:41
 "Money Ain't the Key" (featuring Lisa Lee) - 4:16
 "Iparhoun Ores" (featuring Peter_D from Master Tempo) (There Are Times) - 3:41
 "Sto Eipa Hilies Fores" (I've Told You a Thousand Times) - 3:07
 "Vradiazi" (It's Getting Dark) - 3:38
 "Hot" - 3:10
 "Secret Combination" (Master Tempo Mix) - 3:53

Singles 
"Secret Combination"
 "Secret Combination" was the first and only single to be released from the album. It was first released as a radio single on February 6, 2008 and then as a digital download and CD single. The song is Greece's entry in the Eurovision Song Contest 2008.

Release history

Chart performance
The album entered the Cypriot Albums Chart at number ten, making it her lowest peak there. The album entered at number 20 on the Greek charts.

Charts

Singles

References 

2008 albums
Greek-language albums
Kalomira albums